The Communist League  in Canada was founded as the  "Revolutionary Workers League/Ligue Ouvrière Révolutionnaire" (RWL) in 1977 as the result of a merger of the League for Socialist Action (LSA), the Revolutionary Marxist Group (RMG) and the Groupe Marxiste Revolutionaire.

Originally a Trotskyist party, the RWL was the Canadian section of the  Fourth International  (FI). The group followed the US Socialist Workers Party's (SWP) trajectory away from Trotskyism in favour of a view of Fidel Castro's Cuba as the vanguard of world revolution. The RWL purged members who did not support the new orientation, many of whom went on to form Socialist Challenge and Gauche Socialiste.

In the late 1980s, the RWL left the FI to become part of the new Pathfinder tendency spearheaded by the SWP. It changed its name to the Communist League in 1990. The new group ceased publication of the English Socialist Voice in favour of selling The Militant, published in New York City by the SWP.

Michel Prairie is the group's general secretary and primary spokesperson.

In early 2004, John Riddell, the RWL's former national secretary, his partner Suzanne Weiss, and Roger Annis left the CL over a dispute regarding protests against the 2003 invasion of Iraq, and started Socialist Voice, taking the name of the RWL's old newspaper.

The CL operates a Pathfinder Bookstore in Montreal.

Candidates for public office

The Communist League has run candidates in some federal, provincial and municipal elections in Canada, most notably in Ontario and Quebec.

As the Communist League has not registered as a political party with Elections Canada, their candidates are listed as "non-affiliated" on the ballot.

References

Political parties established in 1977
Communist parties in Canada
1977 establishments in Canada